The 1997 Australian motorcycle Grand Prix was the last round of the 1997 Grand Prix motorcycle racing season. It took place on 5 October 1997 at the Phillip Island Grand Prix Circuit.

500 cc classification

250 cc classification

125 cc classification

References

Australian motorcycle Grand Prix
Australian
Motorcycle
Motorsport at Phillip Island